Robot Bastard! is a 17-minute short film and Rob Schrab's directorial debut.

The film follows Robot Bastard on a mission to save the president's daughter, Catherine.

External links
 Official site
 

2002 films
2002 short films
American short films
2000s English-language films